American actor and film director Tommy Lee Jones has appeared in numerous films and television series since his acting debut in 1970. One of his first notable roles was as Oliver "Doolittle Mooney" Lynn in Coal Miner's Daughter with Sissy Spacek (1980). He then went on to play one of his most notable roles as U.S. Marshal Samuel Gerard in the 1993 thriller film The Fugitive with Harrison Ford. He has had starring roles in the films The Client (1994), Natural Born Killers (1994), Cobb (1994), Batman Forever (1995), and Volcano (1997). Also in 1997, he was cast as Agent K in the science fiction action comedy film Men in Black opposite Will Smith, a role he went on to reprise in Men in Black II (2002), and Men in Black 3 (2012). Other notable film roles include terrorist William "Bill" Strannix in Under Siege (1992), villain Two-Face in Batman Forever (1995), parole officer Travis Lehman in Double Jeopardy, Texas Ranger Roland Sharp in Man of the House (2005), rancher Pete Perkins in The Three Burials of Melquiades Estrada (2005), Sheriff Ed Tom Bell in No Country for Old Men (2007), Hank Deerfield in In the Valley of Elah (2007),  Colonel Chester Phillips in Captain America: The First Avenger (2011), and CIA Director Robert Dewey in Jason Bourne (2016).

He has played several real-life people in film including businessman Clay Shaw in JFK (1991), Radical Republican Congressman Thaddeus Stevens in Lincoln (2012), U.S. Army General Douglas MacArthur in Emperor (2012), Joseph L. Galloway in Shock and Awe (2017), and is set to portray Jeremiah Joseph O'Keefe in the upcoming film The Burial.

His notable television roles include playing Howard Hughes in the television film The Amazing Howard Hughes (1977) and Texas Ranger Woodrow F. Call in the television miniseries Lonesome Dove (1989).

Film

Television

Stage

References

External links
 

Male actor filmographies
American filmographies